Halo Legends is a collection of 7 short films set in the Halo universe. Financed by the franchise's overseer 343 Industries, the stories were created by six Japanese anime production houses: Bee Train, Bones, Casio Entertainment, Production I.G., Studio 4°C, and Toei Animation. Shinji Aramaki, creator and director of Appleseed and Appleseed Ex Machina, serves as the project's creative advisor. Warner Bros. released Legends on DVD and Blu-ray Disc on February 16, 2010.

The idea for an anime compilation existed for years before there was momentum for the project. 343 creative director Frank O'Connor produced story outlines or finished scripts that the production houses animated in a variety of styles.

Development

To oversee development of the entire Halo franchise, Microsoft created an internal division, 343 Industries, to manage the Halo brand.  Frank O'Connor, 343's creative director, said that such a move was vital: "If you look at how George Lucas held on to Star Wars, not just to make money from action figures but to control the direction the universe went in, you can see why we think it's pretty vital."

Halo Legends had origins in the 2006 Marvel Comics tie-in, The Halo Graphic Novel; O'Connor said that the idea of an anime compilation existed for years before there was momentum for the project. Wanting to tell smaller stories in a different format than video games and novels and in different art styles, O'Connor said that anime was a natural fit. An additional consideration was that 343 Industries felt that the Japanese style of narrative fit the stories well. Most of the animation studios Microsoft approached were available for the project. Most studios were "afraid" of creating their own stories, even if they were familiar with the series, so O'Connor sent them possible story treatments. Microsoft was deeply involved in making sure story details were correct and writing the scripts for the stories—O'Connor estimated that 50% of the dialogue in the final products were verbatim from the original scripts. While all the stories save one are considered canon, O'Connor noted that some discrepancies were the cause of artistic interpretation.

The animation studios were given wide latitude in their presentation. "We realized very early on [that Halo] could take interpretation," said O'Connor, saying that the look-and-feel of the universe persisted even through differing artistic styles. In developing their stories and styles, the anime studios were supplied with access to Halos story bible and art assets.

One of the artistic styles that is the most radical departure from traditional animation styles is in "The Duel", which employs a filter that makes every cell look as though it was hand painted by watercolors. His goal that he was aiming for in this project was, "to make audiences understand there should be other styles of animation beyond the existing two primary kinds of animation presented—precisely cel-drawing 2D style and CG 3D style. I wanted to show that creators are not limited, that they have many options for different (animation) styles to create stories."
  

Voice recording for the English dub was done by Seraphim Digital in Houston, Texas.

Episodes
Several episodes were originally broadcast on Halo Waypoint on the specified date. The episodes range in length from ten to twenty minutes.

The DVD released in 2010 has another episode sequence.
 Origins I
 Origins II
 The Duel
 Homecoming
 Odd One Out
 Prototype
 The Babysitter
 The Package

Release and reception
Halo Legends was originally to be released on February 9, but launch was pushed back a week to February 16. The compilation comes in three different retail packages: a standard DVD release with all the episodes, a two-disc special-edition which contains additional commentary, and the Blu-ray Disc edition, featuring the special-edition features and a summary of the Halo storyline. The film's United States premiere was held at the AMC Metreon in San Francisco on February 10, with the companion soundtrack released by Sumthing Distribution the day previous.

Reception to Legends was mostly positive. Orlando Parfit of IGN UK wrote that while the decision to merge Halo and Japanese anime seemed an odd choice, "Halo Legends proves a successful—if uneven—attempt to fuse these two universes, and will certainly prove essential viewing for those with more than a passing interest in Bungie's seminal shooters." IGN US reviewers Cindy White and Christopher Monfette said that the short films "prove surprisingly accessible to sci-fi fans in general," and that the collection was "well worth" the time. Matt Miller of Game Informer said that Halo Legends would appeal to story-interested fans of the franchise, not those who cared about multiplayer gameplay.

Based on Rentrak and Home Media Magazine numbers, Legends ranked second and fourth in Blu-ray Disc and DVD sales, respectively, during its first week of sales in the United States. It also ranked seventh in Blu-ray Disc rankings in Japan. In its second week it dropped off the US Blu-ray Disc Top 20 charts, and slipped to tenth for DVD sales. According to The-Numbers.com, Legends sold $2.56 million worth of merchandise or 168,000 DVDs its first week. Sales later reached , selling almost 600,000 units. As of 2018, DVD sales have grossed  in the United States.

Soundtrack
The soundtrack was composed by various artists, such as Tetsuya Takahashi and Yasuharu Takanashi. Although the soundtrack contains mostly remixes of original work by Martin O'Donnell and Michael Salvatori, it also has some original material of its own.

References

External links
Official Video Release Website

Acclaimed Director-Designer Shinji Aramaki Discusses "The Package" Episode of Halo Legends

2010 films
2010 animated films
2010 direct-to-video films
2010 action films
2010s American animated films
2010s science fiction films
American anthology films
Direct-to-video animated films
Japanese short films
2010s Japanese-language films
American adult animated films
Animated films based on video games
Anime films based on video games
Anime-influenced Western animation
Bee Train Production
Bones (studio)
Films set in the 26th century
Works based on Halo (franchise)
Production I.G
Science fiction anime and manga
Studio 4°C
Toei Animation original video animation
Warner Bros. direct-to-video animated films
Films scored by Yasuharu Takanashi
2010s English-language films